The Lehi North Branch Meetinghouse, located at 1190 North 500 West in Lehi, Utah, was built in 1894 and was extended in 1917.  It includes Gothic Revival and Classical Revival architecture.  It has also been known as Lehi Third Ward Meetinghouse and as Zion's Hill Meetinghouse.

References

Churches on the National Register of Historic Places in Utah
Gothic Revival church buildings in Utah
Neoclassical architecture in Utah
Churches completed in 1917
Religious buildings and structures in Utah County, Utah
Buildings and structures in Lehi, Utah
National Register of Historic Places in Utah County, Utah